The plantar cuneocuboid ligament is a fibrous band that connects the plantar surfaces of the cuboid to the lateral surface of the cuneiform bones.

References 

Foot
Ligaments